The Knights of Columbus (K of C) is a global Catholic fraternal service order founded by Michael J. McGivney on March 29, 1882. Membership is limited to practicing Catholic men. It is led by Patrick E. Kelly, the order's 14th Supreme Knight.

The organization was founded in March 1882 as a mutual benefit society for working-class and immigrant Catholics in the United States. In addition to providing an insurance system for its members, its charter states that it endeavors "to promote such social and intellectual intercourse among its members as shall be desirable and proper". It has grown to support refugee relief, Catholic education, local parishes and dioceses, and global Catholic social and political causes. The Knights promote the Catholic view on public policy issues, including opposition to same-sex marriage and abortion.

The organization also provides certain financial services to the individual and institutional Catholic market. Its wholly owned insurance company, one of the largest in the world, underwrites more than twomillion insurance contracts, totaling more than $114billion of life insurance in force as of 2021. It is a Fortune 1000 company based on its annual revenues.The order also owns the Knights of Columbus Asset Advisors, a money management firm which invests in accordance with Catholic social teachings.

As of 2019, there were nearly twomillion members around the world.  Women may participate in K of C through the Columbiettes and other female auxiliaries, and boys may join the Columbian Squires. The Order comprises four different "degrees", each one of which exemplifies one of the core principles of the order. There are more than 16,000 local Knights of Columbus councils around the world, including over 300 on college campuses.

History

Early years 
American Catholic priest Michael J. McGivney founded the Knights of Columbus at St. Mary's Church in 1882 as a mutual benefit society for Catholic immigrants in New Haven, Connecticut.  As a parish priest in an immigrant community, McGivney saw what could happen to a family when the main income earner died. This was before most government support programs were established. Because of religious and ethnic discrimination, Catholics in the late 19th century were regularly excluded from labor unions, popular fraternal organizations, and other organized groups that provided such social services.

Although its first councils were all in Connecticut, the Order spread throughout New England and the United States in subsequent years. As the order expanded outside of Connecticut, structural changes in the late 1880s and 1890s were instituted to give the Knights a federalist system with local, state, and national levels of government. This allowed them to coordinate activities across states and localities.

20th century 

During World War I, the Knights established soldiers' welfare centers in the U.S. and abroad. After the war, the Knights participated in education, occupational training, and employment programs for veterans.

The Oregon Compulsory Education Act of 1922 would have disallowed parochial schools, including Catholic schools, in that state. The Knights of Columbus challenged the law in court, and, in a landmark 1925 ruling (Pierce v. Society of Sisters), the U.S. Supreme Court struck it down.

To combat the animus targeted at racial and religious minorities, including Catholics, the Order formed a historical commission which published a series of books on their contributions, among other activities. The "Knights of Columbus Racial Contributions Series" of books included three titles: The Gift of Black Folk, by W. E. B. Du Bois, The Jews in the Making of America by George Cohen, and The Germans in the Making of America by Frederick Schrader.

Meanwhile, though the membership system at the time did not explicitly exclude African Americans, as few as one negative vote (and later, four or five) against a prospective candidate (no matter the size of the council) was enough to deny someone entry. This occurred in a racist manner often enough, especially in the Deep South, that the Josephites helped found the Knights of Peter Claver in 1909 for African Americans. The KoC national leadership later amended their policies so that rejections required a majority of council members.

Around 1915, during the nadir of American race relations, the Ku Klux Klan began promoting a conspiracy theory claiming that Fourth Degree Knights swore an oath to exterminate Freemasons and Protestants. The Knights of Columbia vehemently denied the existence of any such oath, calling the rumors libel. In 1923, the Knights of Columbus offered $25,000 to any person with proof that the fake oath attributed to the fourth degree membership was part of any authentic ceremony. The Knights began suing distributors for libel in an effort to stop this, and the KKK ended its publication of the false oath.

Recent history 

According to church historian Massimo Faggioli, the Knights of Columbus are today "'an extreme version' of a post-VaticanII phenomenon, the rise of discrete lay groups that have become centers of power themselves."

As the Order and its charitable works grew, so did its prominence within the Church. Pope John Paul I's first audience with a layman was with Supreme Knight Dechant, and Pope John Paul II met with Supreme Knight Virgil Dechant three days after his installation. During the pope's 1979 visit to the United States, the Supreme Officers and Board were the only lay organization to receive an audience.

President Richard Nixon addressed the Supreme Convention in 1971. President Ronald Reagan spoke in 1982 and 1986 and George W. Bush spoke in 2004. George H. W. Bush spoke as vice president in 1984 and then again as president in 1992. President Bill Clinton sent a videotaped message to the 111th Supreme Convention saying the Order's "contributions to the Catholic Church and to your communities merit our applause."

Faggioli believes the scope of the Knights' philanthropy can "create influence through money, especially in important places like Rome or Washington, D.C."

Organization and principles 

The order is dedicated to the principles of charity, unity, fraternity, and patriotism. Membership is restricted to adult male Catholics. , there were 2 million knights.

Each member belongs to one of more than 16,000 local "councils" around the world. The college councils program started at The Catholic University of America in 1898. The oldest continuously running college council is the University of Notre Dame Council #1477, chartered in 1910. As of 2018, there are more than 300 college councils. Separate organizations, known as Fourth Degree assemblies, may form color guards to attend important civic and church events; they are often the most visible arm of the Knights.

The Supreme Council is the governing body of the order. It elects insurance members to serve three-year terms on a 24-member Board of Directors. Leaders' salaries are set by the board of directors and ratified by the delegates to the Supreme Convention. The seven-figure salaries of senior K of C officers have been criticized as excessive.

In 1969, the Knights opened a 23-story headquarters building in New Haven.

(*Appointed annually by each council's Grand Knight or assembly's Navigator)
(**Appointed for a three-year term by the Supreme Knight)

Charitable giving 

Charity is the foremost important principle of the Knights of Columbus. At their 2019 convention, then-Supreme Knight Carl Anderson said that the organization had donated $185million and 76million volunteer-hours toward charity projects in 2018. Charitable activities include support for refugees, aid for victims of natural disasters, and advocating Catholic ethics, such as opposition to same-sex marriage and opposition to abortion.

Beginning in 1897, the National Council encouraged local councils to establish funds to support members affected by the 1890s depression. Councils also offered employment agency services and provided aid to the poor and sick. Aid has also been dispensed to assist victims of natural and man-made disasters, starting with a flood in Kansas in 1903. In 2015 alone, the order donated hundreds of thousands of dollars to victims of typhoons and other natural disasters.

During times of war, the Order supports aid to refugees. Between 2014 and 2018, the Knights gave more than $2million to provide food, shelter, clothing, and medical care to persecuted Christians and other religious minorities in the Middle East. The Knights donated $250,000 in 2018 to help refugees crossing over the Mexico–United States border who were seeking asylum in the United States and later expanded the program. Within days of the 2022 Russian invasion of Ukraine, the 2,000 Knights of Columbus in the country worked to help those impacted. They began by providing food and clothing to those at train and bus stations in Lviv who were fleeing into Poland. They then began organizing busses to take people the Polish border. In the first three months of the war, the Knights in Poland helped more than 300,000 people, or 10% of those who fled to that country.

The Knights of Columbus has donated more than $600 million to those with intellectual and physical disabilities. One of the largest recipients of aid in this area has been the Special Olympics, where the Knights have been involved since the very first games in 1968.

After the Knights had donated more than 1,000 ultrasound machines to crisis pregnancy centers from 2009 to 2019, Anderson said, "Our ultrasound initiative is now the greatest humanitarian achievement in the history of the Knights of Columbus. ... We can, and I am confident that we will, save millions of unborn lives." Following the United States Supreme Court decision in Dobbs v. Jackson Women's Health Organization, Supreme Knight Patrick E. Kelly called on the order to increase their support for women facing unplanned and crisis pregnancies with the Aid and Support After Pregnancy (ASAP) initiative.

The Knights also donate to the institutional church, including being a major donor to the United States Conference of Catholic Bishops and the Canadian Conference of Catholic Bishops. , the Knights' Vicarius Christi fund has contributed more than $57 million to the charitable efforts of the pope. The Knights have supported the Vatican's news operation for decades.

In the field of education, the Knights of Columbus have a number of scholarships and other programs for seminarians, veterans, students at The Catholic University of America, and at other Catholic colleges. Especially during World War I and World War II, the Order operated a number of "huts" to support troops serving in combat, regardless of race or religion.

Insurance program

Early years
The original insurance system devised by McGivney gave a deceased Knight's widow a $1,000 death benefit. Each member was assessed $1 upon a death, and when the number of Knights grew beyond 1,000, the assessment decreased according to the rate of increase. Each member, regardless of age, was assessed equally. As a result, younger, healthier members could expect to pay more over the course of their lifetimes than those men who joined when they were older.

There was also a Sick Benefit Deposit for members who fell ill and could not work. Each sick Knight was entitled to draw up to $5 a week for 13 weeks. If he remained sick after that, the council to which he belonged determined the sum of money given to him.

In the post-World War II era, to enhance yields on its capital, the organization began investing in real estate leaseback transactions. Between 1952 and 1962, 18 pieces of land were purchased for a total of $29million. Late in 1953 the order purchased the land beneath Yankee Stadium for $2.5million. In 1971, the City of New York took the land by eminent domain.

Modern program

The order offers permanent and term life insurance, as well as annuities, long term care insurance, and disability insurance. The order has more than $109billion of life insurance policies in force and $26billion in assets as of 2019. A. M. Best ranked it 49th on the list of all life insurance companies in North America.

The order chooses equities that first, are a sound investment, and second, do not conflict with the investment guidelines produced by the United States bishops based on Catholic social teaching. Its insurance operation invests in loans to various Catholic institutions. , over $500million had been loaned through the ChurchLoan program.

For 40 consecutive years, the order has received A. M. Best's highest rating, A++. A 2017 lawsuit claimed the Knights were inflating their membership numbers to improve their rankings and demanded $100million in damages. A jury ruled in favor of the Knights in two of the three counts of the lawsuit, but ordered them to pay $500,000 for breach of contract.

Promotion of the Catholic faith

Efforts against religious discrimination 

Since its earliest days, the Knights of Columbus has been a "Catholic anti-defamation society." In 1914, it established a Commission on Religious Prejudices. As part of the effort, the order distributed pamphlets, and lecturers toured the country speaking on how Catholics could love and be loyal to America.

The creation of the 4th Degree, with its emphasis on patriotism, performed an anti-defamation function as well as asserting claims to Americanism. In response to a defamatory "bogus oath" circulated by the KKK, in 1914 the Knights set up a framework for a lecture series and educational programs to combat anti-Catholic sentiment.

New evangelization 

The Knights have been urged to take a prominent role in the new evangelization. The CIS published a series on the new evangelization in 2011, and donations to other Catholic mass communication services represent one of the Knights' major expenditures. The Knights have also established councils in both secular and Catholic universities.

Political activity 

While the Knights were politically active from an early date, in the years following the Second Vatican Council, as the "Catholic anti-defamation character" of the order began to diminish as Catholics gained more acceptance, the leadership began to use its financial resources to directly influence the direction of the church. That led to the creation of a "variety of new programs reflecting the proliferation of the new social ministries of the church."

At times, the leadership of the order has been both liberal and conservative. Martin H. Carmody and Luke E. Hart were both political conservatives, but John J. Phelan was a Democratic politician prior to becoming Supreme Knight, John Swift's "strong support for economic democracy and social-welfare legislation marks him as a fairly representative New Deal anti-communist," and Francis P. Matthews was a civil rights official and member of Harry Truman's cabinet. Anderson previously served in the Office of Public Liaison under Ronald Reagan.

The Knights of Columbus is classified as a 501(c)(8) fraternal benefit society by the IRS. Unlike the more common 501(c)(3) nonprofits, 501(c)(8)s are allowed to engage in limited direct political activity without jeopardizing their tax exemptions. However, Anderson has said “One of our most important traditions throughout our 125-year history is that we do not, as an organization, become involved in partisan politics."

The Knights of Columbus supports political awareness and activity among its members and local councils. Public policy activity is limited to issue-specific campaigns, typically dealing with Catholic family and sanctity of life issues. They state that
In addition to performing charitable works, the Knights of Columbus encourages its members to meet their responsibilities as Catholic citizens and to become active in the political life of their local communities, to vote and to speak out on the public issues of the day.... In the political realm, this means opening our public policy efforts and deliberations to the life of Christ and the teachings of the Church. In accord with our Bishops, the Knights of Columbus has consistently maintained positions that take these concerns into account. The order supports and promotes the social doctrine of the Church, including a robust vision of religious liberty that embraces religion's proper role in the private and public spheres.

The order opposed the persecution of Catholics in Mexico during the Cristero War, and opposed communism. during the 20th century, the order also established the Commission on Religious Prejudices and the Knights of Columbus Historical Commission, organizations which fought against racism. It was also supportive of trade unionism, and published the works "of the broad array of intellectuals", including George Schuster, Samuel Flagg Bemis, Allan Nevins, and W. E. B. DuBois.

During the Cold War, the order had a history of waging anti-socialist, anti-communist and anti-anarchist crusades. They lobbied for the addition of the words "under God" to the Pledge of Allegiance, as a religious response to Soviet atheism. The Knights have actively opposed the legalization of same-sex marriage and in terms of funding, they have also been a key contributor to local measures against same-sex marriage.

Subsidiaries

Museum 

On March 10, 2001, the order opened a museum in New Haven dedicated to their history. The 77,000 square foot building cost  to renovate. It holds mosaics on loan from the Vatican and gifts from Popes, the membership application from John F. Kennedy, and a number of other items related to the history of the Knights. Near the entrance is the cross held by Jesus Christ on the facade of St. Peter's Basilica before undergoing a Knights-financed renovation.

Knights of Columbus Asset Advisors 

In 2015, the order launched Knights of Columbus Asset Advisors, a money management firm which invests money in accordance with Catholic social teaching. The firm uses the Socially Responsible Investment Guidelines published by the United States Conference of Catholic Bishops to guide their investment decisions. The guidelines include protecting human life, promoting human dignity, reducing arms production, pursuing economic justice, protecting the environment, and encouraging corporate responsibility.

In addition to the wholly owned subsidiary, it also purchased 20% of Boston Advisors, a boutique investment management firm, managing assets for institutional and high-net-worth investors. Knights of Columbus Asset Advisors manages the fixed-income strategies for their funds while Boston Advisors sub-advises on the equity strategies. Knights of Columbus Asset Advisors also offers model portfolio, outsourced CIO services, a bank loan strategy, and other alternative investment strategies. In 2019, the Knights purchased the institutional management business of Boston Advisors.

Saint John Paul II National Shrine 

The order owns and operates the Saint John Paul II National Shrine in Washington D.C. In 2011, the Order purchased the 130,000-square-foot John Paul II Cultural Center. The mission as a cultural center ended in 2009 and the Knights rebranded it as a shrine to Pope John Paul II. Soon after the pope was canonized, the United States Conference of Catholic Bishops named the building a national shrine.

Each year 64,000 pilgrims visit the shrine, which features video content, interactive displays, and personal effects from John Paul. There is also a first class relic of the pope's blood on display for veneration. It also serves as a base for the Order in Washington, D.C.

Notable Knights 

Many notable Catholic men from all over the world have been Knights of Columbus. In the US, some of the most notable include John F. Kennedy; Ted Kennedy; Al Smith; Sargent Shriver; Samuel Alito; Conrad Hilton; John Boehner; Ray Flynn; Jeb Bush; film maker John Ford; and Sergeant Major Daniel Daly, a two-time Medal of Honor recipient.

In the world of sports, Vince Lombardi, the famed former coach of the Green Bay Packers; James Connolly, the first Olympic gold medal champion in modern times; Floyd Patterson, former heavyweight boxing champion; and baseball legend Babe Ruth were all knights.

On October 15, 2006, Bishop Rafael Guízar y Valencia (1878–1938) was canonized by Pope Benedict XVI in Rome. In 2000, six other Knights, who were killed in the violence following the Mexican Revolution, were declared saints by Pope John Paul II.

Emblem of the order 

The emblem of the order was designed by Past Supreme Knight James T. Mullen and adopted at the second Supreme Council meeting on May 12, 1883. Shields used by medieval knights served as the inspiration. The emblem consists of a shield mounted on a Formée cross, which is an artistic representation of the cross of Christ. This represents the Catholic identity of the order.

Mounted on the shield are three objects: the fasces, an anchor, and a dagger. In ancient Rome, the fasces was carried before magistrates as an emblem of authority. The order uses it as "symbolic of authority which must exist in any tightly-bonded and efficiently operating organization." The anchor represents Christopher Columbus, admiral under the orders of the kings of Spain and patron of this partnership, here a symbol of the Catholic contribution to America. The short sword, or dagger, was a weapon used by medieval knights. The shield as a whole, with the letters "K of C", represents "Catholic Knighthood in organized merciful action."

Auxiliary groups

Women's auxiliaries 

Many councils also have women's auxiliaries. At the turn of the 20th century, two were formed by local councils, each taking the name Daughters of Isabella. They expanded and issued charters to other circles but never merged. The newer organization renamed itself the Catholic Daughters of the Americas in 1921, and both have structures independent of the Knights of Columbus. Other groups are known as the Columbiettes. In the Philippines, the ladies' auxiliary is known as the Daughters of Mary Immaculate.

A proposal in 1896 to establish councils for women did not pass and was never proposed again.

Columbian Squires 

The Knights' official junior organization is the Columbian Squires. According to its founder Barnabas McDonald, "The supreme purpose of the Columbian Squires is character building."

It was founded in 1925 in Duluth, Minnesota, by Barnabas McDonald. The formation of new Squire Circles in the United States and Canada is discouraged, as the Order desires to move youth activities from exclusive clubs into the local parish youth groups.

Similar Christian organizations
The Knights of Columbus is a member of the International Alliance of Catholic Knights (IACK), which includes fifteen fraternal orders such as the Knights of Saint Columbanus in Ireland, the Knights of St Columba in Great Britain, the Knights of Peter Claver in the United States, the Knights of the Southern Cross in Australia and New Zealand, the Knights of Marshall in Ghana, the Knights of Da Gama in South Africa, and the Knights of Saint Mulumba in Nigeria.

The Loyal Orange Institution, also known as the Orange Order, is a similar organization for Protestant Christians.

See also 

 Columbus Fountain
 Columbus School of Law
 Father Millet Cross
 James Cardinal Gibbons Memorial Statue
 Knights of Columbus Hostel fire
 List of Knights of Columbus buildings
 List of Massachusetts State Deputies of the Knights of Columbus
 Manuscripta
 Parish Priest (book)
 Pope John Paul II Cultural Center

Notes

References

Works cited

Further reading

Archival collections
Knights of Columbus and Catholic Daughters of America, Montclair, New Jersey Chapters (Monsignor Noe Field Archives & Special Collections Center, Seton Hall University)

External links 

 
 Father Michael J. McGivney Guild

 
Financial services companies established in 1882
1882 establishments in Connecticut
Religious organizations established in 1882
Organizations based in New Haven, Connecticut
Catholic advocacy groups